Shutter Island is a 2010 American neo-noir psychological thriller film directed by Martin Scorsese and adapted by Laeta Kalogridis, based on the 2003 novel of the same name by Dennis Lehane. Leonardo DiCaprio stars as Deputy U.S. Marshal Edward "Teddy" Daniels, who is investigating a psychiatric facility on Shutter Island after one of the patients goes missing. Mark Ruffalo plays his partner and fellow deputy marshal, Ben Kingsley plays the facility's lead psychiatrist, Max von Sydow plays a German doctor, and Michelle Williams plays Daniels' wife. 

Released on February 19, 2010, Shutter Island received generally positive reviews from critics, was chosen by the National Board of Review as one of the top ten films of 2010, and grossed $299 million worldwide. The film is noted for its soundtrack, which prominently used classical music, such as that of Gustav Mahler, Krzysztof Penderecki, György Ligeti, John Cage, Ingram Marshall, and Max Richter.

Plot
In 1954, U.S. Marshal Edward "Teddy" Daniels and his new partner Chuck Aule travel to Ashecliffe Hospital for the criminally insane on Shutter Island, Boston Harbor to investigate the disappearance of Rachel Solando, who drowned her three children.

The staff, led by psychiatrist Dr. John Cawley, appear uncooperative. The marshals learn that Solando's doctor Lester Sheehan left the island on vacation immediately after Solando disappeared. Teddy experiences migraine headaches, flashbacks of his experiences as a U.S. Army soldier during the liberation of Dachau and also vivid dreams of his wife Dolores, who was killed in a fire set by arsonist Andrew Laeddis. Teddy explains to Chuck that he took the case to find Laeddis, believing he is on the island. Solando suddenly resurfaces, prompting Teddy to break into a restricted ward where he meets patient George Noyce. He claims the doctors are experimenting on patients, some of whom are taken to a lighthouse to be lobotomized, and warns Teddy that everyone is deceiving him.

Teddy regroups with Chuck and they climb the cliffs toward the lighthouse but become separated. Seeing Chuck's body on the rocks below, Teddy investigates but finds only a cave where a woman claiming to be the real Solando is hiding. She states that she is a former psychiatrist who discovered experiments to develop mind control but was forcibly committed. She says that Cawley and his assistant Dr. Naehring will use Teddy's war trauma to feign a psychotic break, allowing them to have him committed. Teddy returns to the hospital and is greeted by Cawley. When Teddy asks about Chuck's whereabouts, Cawley firmly insists that Teddy does not have a partner, that he arrived on the island alone.

Convinced Chuck was taken to the lighthouse,  Teddy heads there but runs into Naehring, who attempts to sedate him. Teddy overpowers him and breaks into the lighthouse, only to discover Cawley waiting for him. Teddy confronts Cawley and reveals his encounter with Solando, saying he believes Cawley is experimenting on him. Cawley denies that Solando ever existed and insists that Teddy has not been drugged, explaining the tremors as withdrawals from Chlorpromazine, an anti-psychotic medication that Teddy has been taking for two years. Chuck arrives and reveals he is in fact Dr. Sheehan. Cawley explains that "Teddy" is the real Andrew Laeddis, incarcerated for murdering his manic depressive wife after she drowned their three children. Andrew did not seek help for Dolores when she burned down their apartment, instead moving his family to a lake house, where the tragedy struck. Cawley explains that Andrew's delusion is a result of his guilt, his migraines and hallucinations are in fact withdrawal symptoms, and recent events have been an elaborate role play designed to cure him. Overwhelmed by his sudden recall, Andrew faints.

Awakening later, Andrew calmly recounts the truth, satisfying the doctors. Cawley notes that they had achieved this state nine months before, but Andrew quickly regressed. He warns this will be Andrew's last chance and if he lapses again he will be lobotomized. Some time later, Andrew relaxes on the hospital grounds with Sheehan. Appearing delusional, Andrew again refers to Sheehan as "Chuck" and says they must leave the island. Sheehan signals to Cawley, who orders that Andrew be lobotomized. Andrew then asks Sheehan if it would be worse "to live as a monster, or to die as a good man?" A stunned Sheehan calls Andrew "Teddy" but the latter does not respond and leaves peacefully with the orderlies.

Cast

Production
The rights to Dennis Lehane's novel Shutter Island were first optioned to Columbia Pictures in 2003. Columbia did not act on the option, and it lapsed back to Lehane, who sold it to Phoenix Pictures. Phoenix hired Laeta Kalogridis, and together they developed the film for a year. Director Martin Scorsese and actor Leonardo DiCaprio were both attracted to the project. Production began on March 6, 2008.

Lehane's inspiration for the hospital and island setting was Long Island in Boston Harbor, which he had visited during the blizzard of 1978 as a child with his uncle and family.

Shutter Island was mainly filmed in Massachusetts, with Taunton being the location for the World War II flashback scenes. Old industrial buildings in Taunton's Whittenton Mills Complex replicated the Dachau concentration camp. The old Medfield State Hospital in Medfield, Massachusetts, was another key location. Cawley's office scenes were the second floor of the chapel during the late evening. Lights were shone through the windows to make it look like it was daytime. The crew painted the hospital's brick walls to look like plywood. This served the dual purpose of acting as scenery and blocking the set from view of a local road. The crew wanted to film at the old Worcester State Hospital, but demolition of surrounding buildings made it impossible. The stone lodge, next to Leach Pond, at Borderland State Park in Easton, Massachusetts, was used for the cabin scene. The film used Peddocks Island as a setting for the story's island. East Point, in Nahant, Massachusetts, was the location for the lighthouse scenes. The scenes where Teddy and Chuck are caught in the hurricane were filmed at the Wilson Mountain Reservation in Dedham, Massachusetts. Filming ended on July 2, 2008.

Music 

Shutter Island: Music from the Motion Picture was released on February 2, 2010, by Rhino Records. The film does not have an original score. Instead, Scorsese's longtime collaborator Robbie Robertson created an ensemble of previously recorded material to use in the film.

According to a statement on Paramount's website: "The collection of modern classical music [on the soundtrack album] was hand-selected by Robertson, who is proud of its scope and sound. 'This may be the most outrageous and beautiful soundtrack I've ever heard.' [Robertson stated]."

A full track listing of the album is below. All the musical works are featured in the final film.

Disc 1
 "Fog Tropes" (Ingram Marshall) – 
 "Symphony No. 3: Passacaglia – Allegro Moderato" (Krzysztof Penderecki) – 
 "Music for Marcel Duchamp" (John Cage) – 
 "Hommage à John Cage" – 
 "Lontano" (György Ligeti) – 
 "Rothko Chapel 2" (Morton Feldman) – 
 "Cry" – 
 "On the Nature of Daylight" – 
 "Uaxuctum: The Legend of the Mayan City Which They Themselves Destroyed for Religious Reasons – 3rd Movement" (Giacinto Scelsi) – 
 "Quartet for Strings and Piano in A Minor" (Gustav Mahler) – 

Disc 2
 "Christian Zeal and Activity" (John Adams) – 
 "Suite for Symphonic Strings: Nocturne" (Lou Harrison) – 
 "Lizard Point" – 
 "Four Hymns: II for Cello and Double Bass" (Alfred Schnittke) – 
 "Root of an Unfocus" (John Cage) – 
 "Prelude – The Bay" – 
 "Wheel of Fortune" – 
 "Tomorrow Night" – 
 "This Bitter Earth"/"On the Nature of Daylight" –

Genre
Shutter Island is a period piece with nods to different films in the film noir and horror genres, paying particular homage to Alfred Hitchcock's works. Scorsese stated in an interview that the main reference to Teddy Daniels was Dana Andrews's character in Laura, and that he was also influenced by several very low-budget 1940s zombie movies made by Val Lewton. The main frame of the plot resembles that of William Peter Blatty's The Ninth Configuration, as well as The Cabinet of Dr. Caligari. La Croix noted that Shutter Island was a "complex and puzzling" work that borrowed from genres as diverse as detective, fantasy, and the psychological thriller.

There have been differing opinions over the ending of the film, in which Laeddis asks Dr. Sheehan, "which would be worse – to live as a monster, or to die as a good man?", a line that does not appear in the book. Professor James Gilligan of New York University was Scorsese's psychiatric adviser, and he said that Laeddis's last words mean: "I feel too guilty to go on living. I'm not going to actually commit suicide, but I'm going to vicariously commit suicide by handing myself over to these people who're going to lobotomize me." Dennis Lehane, however, said, "Personally, I think he has a momentary flash.… It's just one moment of sanity mixed in the midst of all the other delusions."

Release

The film was originally scheduled to be released by Paramount Pictures in the United States and Canada on October 2, 2009. Paramount later announced it was going to push back the release date to February 19, 2010. Reports attribute the pushback to Paramount not having "the financing in 2009 to spend the $50 to $60 million necessary to market a big awards pic like this", to DiCaprio's unavailability to promote the film internationally, and to Paramount's hope that the economy might rebound enough by February 2010 that a film geared toward adult audiences would be more viable financially.

The film premiered at the 60th Berlin International Film Festival as part of the competition screening on February 13, 2010. Spanish distributor Manga Films distributed the film in Spain after winning a bidding war that reportedly reached the $6 million to $8 million range.

The film also premiered at the Toronto International Film Festival (TIFF) in 2010 and the 62nd Cannes Film Festival in 2009.

Reception

Critical response 
Rotten Tomatoes gives the film an approval rating of 68% based on 260 reviews, with an average rating of 6.7/10. The site's critical consensus reads, "It may not rank with Scorsese's best work, but Shutter Islands gleefully unapologetic genre thrills represent the director at his most unrestrained." On Metacritic, the film received a weighted average score of 63 out of 100, based on 37 critics, indicating "generally favorable reviews". Audiences surveyed by CinemaScore gave the film an average "C+" grade, on an A+ to F scale.

Lawrence Toppman of The Charlotte Observer gave the film 4/4 stars, claiming, "After four decades, Martin Scorsese has earned the right to deliver a simple treatment of a simple theme with flair." Writing for The Wall Street Journal, John Anderson highly praised the film, suggesting it "requires multiple viewings to be fully realized as a work of art. Its process is more important than its story, its structure more important than the almost perfunctory plot twists it perpetrates. It's a thriller, a crime story and a tortured psychological parable about collective guilt." Awarding the film  stars out of 4, Roger Ebert of the Chicago Sun-Times wrote, "the movie is about: atmosphere, ominous portents, the erosion of Teddy's confidence and even his identity. It's all done with flawless directorial command. Scorsese has fear to evoke, and he does it with many notes."

The Orlando Sentinels Roger Moore, who gave the film  stars out of 4, wrote, "It's not bad, but as Scorsese, America's greatest living filmmaker and film history buff should know, even Hitchcock came up short on occasion. See for yourself." Dana Stevens of Slate described the film "an aesthetically and at times intellectually exciting puzzle, but it's never emotionally involving". The Washington Post film critic Ann Hornaday negatively described the film as being "weird". A. O. Scott of The New York Times wrote in his review that "Something TERRIBLE is afoot. Sadly, that something turns out to be the movie itself."

Keith Uhlich of Time Out New York named Shutter Island the fifth-best film of 2010.

Box office
Shutter Island was released alongside The Ghost Writer, and with $41 million finished first at the box office and gave Scorsese his best box office opening to-date. The film remained at #1 in its second weekend, with $22.2 million. Eventually, it grossed worldwide $294,805,697 and became Scorsese's second highest-grossing film worldwide. It is Scorsese's fifth movie to debut at the box office at #1 following Taxi Driver, Goodfellas, Cape Fear, and The Departed.

Home media
Shutter Island was released on DVD and Blu-ray on June 8, 2010, in the US and on August 2, 2010, in the UK. The UK release featured two editions—a standard edition and a limited steel-case edition. For the tenth anniversary, Paramount Pictures released on February 11, 2020, a 4K steelbook + Blu-ray.

Other media

Unproduced TV series
In August 2014, Paramount Television and HBO were reported to be brainstorming a TV series called Ashecliffe, which would serve as an origin story for the film.

Video game
A video game based on the film was released for PC. A Nintendo DS version was planned, but cancelled.

References

External links

 
 
 
 
 
 
 

2010 films
2010 psychological thriller films
2010s American films
2010s English-language films
2010s mystery films
American mystery films
American neo-noir films
American psychological thriller films
Appian Way Productions films
Filicide in fiction
Films about bipolar disorder
Films based on American novels
Films based on thriller novels
Films based on works by Dennis Lehane
Films directed by Martin Scorsese
Films produced by Martin Scorsese
Films set in 1954
Films set in Massachusetts
Films set in psychiatric hospitals
Films set on fictional islands
Films shot in Dedham, Massachusetts
Films with screenplays by Laeta Kalogridis
Paramount Pictures films
Phoenix Pictures films
Psychiatry in the United States in fiction
Self-reflexive films
United States Marshals Service in fiction
Uxoricide in fiction